S. K. Vasanthan is a Malayalam history researcher, academic and writer from Kerala, India. He has published several books in various genres such as essay, novel, short story, history of Kerala and translation.

He received several noted awards including Kerala Sahitya Akademi Award for Scientific Literature and Kerala Sahitya Akademi Award for Overall Contributions.

Biography
S. K. Vasanthan was born on November 17, 1935, at Edappally in present-day Ernakulam district to Karunakara Menon and Thathampally Saraswathi Amma. After completing post graduate degree in Malayalam and English and Ph.d from the University of Kerala, he taught at Kalady Sreesankara College and Sree Sankaracharya Sanskrit University for 35 years.

Chinta later published the novel Ente Gramam, Ente Janatha (translated as "My Village, My People"), which won first prize in the novel competition organized by Chinta Publishers. His second novel Arakkillam was published as various parts in Mathrubhumi. Vasanthan held several positions including assistant editor at Kerala Language Institute, member of the boards of various Universities in Kerala.

He now lives in Kuriachira, Thrissur district.

Notable works
Kerala Samskarika Charitthra Nigandu (Dictionary of Cultural History of Kerala),
Nammal Nadanna Vazhikal (Kerala Cultural History)  
Padinjaran Kavyameemamsa
Kalppadukal part 1 titled as Akam, memoirs
Kalppadukal part 2 titled as Puram, memoirs of friendships and cordial interactions with Agamananda Swamy, S. Guptan Nair, Joseph Mundassery, V. V. K. Valath, Mullanezhi, Vyloppilly, Basheer, N. V. Krishna Warrier, E. M. S. Namboodiripad, Puthezhan, M. S. Devadas, P. Govinda Pillai, Thayatt Sankaran, MRC, V. Aravindakshan, Cherukad, Chathunni Master, Dr. M. S. Menon, Jayapalan Menon, Iyyamcode Sreedharan, M. P. Manmathan, Changampuzha, E. M. Kovoor andE. K. Nayanar.
Ente Gramam, Ente Janatha (novel)
Translation of the book "Jean Christophe" by Romain Rolland based on the life story of Beethoven
Arakkillam (novel)
Appan Thampuran Oru Padanam, study on works of Appan Thampuran
Nalappattu
Samasta Kerala Sahithtya Parishattinte Charithram, history of Samastha Kerala Sahitya Parishad, 
Prasavadam
Cherusseri Pranamam
Pazhaya Then (collections)
Kizhakkinte Velicham, translation of Light of Asia by Sir Edwin Arnold, 
Cherukadinte prathibha (editor) 
Kathayamama (essays)
Vakkanavum Valarchayum: Sahithyasamvadangal (literary essays), 
Panchakanya Smarennithyam (stories)
Prasavadam (editor) 
Koodiyalla Janikkunna Nerathum (stories)

Awards and honors
Kerala Sahitya Akademi Award for Scientific Literature 2007 for his book Kerala Samskarika Charitthra Nigandu (Dictionary of Cultural History of Kerala)
Kerala Sahitya Akademi Award for Overall Contributions 2013
CP Menon Award
Akashavani Award
Award from Kerala Sahitya Akademi in Thunchan Essay Competition
Kerala History Association Award
K Damodaran Award
M. S. Menon Memorial Award

References

1935 births
Living people
Malayalam-language writers
Writers from Kerala
Malayalam literary critics
Indian literary critics
People from Ernakulam district
Recipients of the Kerala Sahitya Akademi Award